All My Friends We're Glorious (or All My Friends We're Glorious: Death of a Bachelor Tour Live) is the fourth live album by Panic! at the Disco and their first as a solo project, fronted by Brendon Urie. It was released on December 15, 2017, in digital versions and as a limited edition double vinyl LP, and documents the band's 2017 Death of a Bachelor Tour concert tour following the release of their fifth album, Death of a Bachelor.

Recorded in April 2017, at the Amway Center in Orlando, Florida, video footage from the show was uploaded to the band's YouTube channel. The album debuted at #185 on the Billboard 200.

Track listing
The album comprises 21 tracks from the tour, and the band simultaneously released live concert footage of each track.

Personnel
Panic! at the Disco
Brendon Urie – lead vocals, rhythm guitars, piano

Additional personnel
Dallon Weekes – bass, backing vocals
Dan Pawlovich – drums, percussion, backing vocals
Kenneth Harris – lead guitars, backing vocals

References

Panic! at the Disco albums
2017 live albums
Fueled by Ramen live albums